Boneh-ye Esmail or Boneh Esmail or Boneh-e Esmail may refer to:
 Boneh-ye Esmail, Bushehr
 Boneh-ye Esmail, Khuzestan